The 1960–61 Eredivisie was the 1st season of the highest-level basketball league in the Netherlands, and the 15th season of the top flight Dutch basketball competition. The Wolves Amsterdam won the title.

Standings

References 

Dutch Basketball League seasons
1975–76 in European basketball